Rajko Uršič (born 20 March 1981) is a retired Slovenian futsal player. He played for the Slovenian national futsal team.

References

External links
NZS profile 

1981 births
Living people
Slovenian men's futsal players
Futsal forwards